The Belle River is a  river in the U.S. state of Michigan, flowing into the St. Clair River in Marine City at .   

Long Lake is fed by the Long Lake Drain, which drains marshy areas to the south of the lake. From Long Lake, the river flows eastward around the north side of Imlay City.

It flows mostly north and east until joined by the north branch, after which it flows mostly south and east into St. Clair County. It passes the north side of Memphis, then turns southeast and passes through the northeast corner of Macomb County. Interstate 94 crosses the river in the northeast corner of Casco Township. 

The river continues east by southeast through China Township and into East China Township, where it turns south less than a half mile from the St. Clair River and parallels the St. Clair for a few miles before its mouth in downtown Marine City.

The river's watershed drains portions of Lapeer, Macomb, Oakland, and St. Clair counties.

References

External links 
 EPA Watershed Profile

Rivers of Michigan
Rivers of Lapeer County, Michigan
Rivers of Macomb County, Michigan
Rivers of Oakland County, Michigan
Rivers of St. Clair County, Michigan
Tributaries of Lake Erie